DESERTEC is a foundation that promotes the production of renewable energy in deserts. The project aims at creating a global renewable energy plan based on the concept of harnessing sustainable powers from sites where renewable sources of energy are more abundant and transferring it through high-voltage direct current transmission to consumption centers. The foundation also works on concepts involving green hydrogen. Multiple types of renewable energy sources are envisioned, but the natural climate of the deserts is key to creating the plan.

The DII evolved in several steps. The first idea was to focus on the transmission of renewable power from the MENA region to Europe. The next idea focused on meeting the domestic demand. The project failed twice due to the problem of transportation and cost-inefficiency. The initiative was revived in 2020 with a focus on green hydrogen, catering to both domestic demand and exports to foreign markets.

Organizations, milestones, and activities

DESERTEC was developed by the Trans-Mediterranean Renewable Energy Cooperation (TREC), a voluntary organisation founded in 2003 by the Club of Rome and the National Energy Research Center Jordan, made up of scientists and experts from across Europe, the Middle East and North Africa (EU-MENA). 
It is from this network that the DESERTEC Foundation later emerged as a non-profit organisation tasked with promoting the DESERTEC solution around the world. Founding members of the foundation are the German Association of the Club of Rome, members of the network of scientists TREC as well as committed private supporters and long-time promoters of the DESERTEC idea. 
In 2009, the DESERTEC Foundation founded the Munich-based industrial initiative 'Dii GmbH' together with partners from the industrial and finance sectors. Its task is to accelerate the implementation of the DESERTEC Concept in the focus region EU-MENA.

The scientific studies done by the German Aerospace Center (DLR) between 2004 and 2007 demonstrated that the desert sun could meet rising power demand in the MENA region while also helping to power Europe, reduce carbon emissions across the EU-MENA region and power desalination plants to provide freshwater to the MENA region. Dii GmbH published a further study called Desert Power 2050 in June 2012. It found that the MENA region would be able to meet its needs for power with renewable energy, while exporting its excess power to create an export industry with an annual volume of more than €60 billion. Meanwhile, by importing desert power, Europe could save around €30/MWh.

By taking into account land and water use, DESERTEC intends to offer an integrated and comprehensive solution to food and water shortages.

TREC

The DESERTEC concept was originated with Dr Gerhard Knies, a German particle physicist and founder of the Trans-Mediterranean Renewable Energy Cooperation (TREC) network of researchers. In 1986, in the wake of the Chernobyl nuclear accident, he was searching for a potential alternative source of clean energy and arrived at the following remarkable conclusion: in just six hours, the world's deserts receive more energy from the sun than humankind consumes in a year. The DESERTEC concept was developed further by TREC – an international network of scientists, experts and politicians from the field of renewable energies – founded in 2003 by the Club of Rome and the National Energy Research Center Jordan. One of the most famous members was Prince Hassan bin Talal of Jordan. In 2009, TREC emerged to the non-profit DESERTEC Foundation.

DESERTEC Foundation
The DESERTEC Foundation was founded on 20 January 2009 with the aim of promoting the implementation of the DESERTEC Concept for clean power from deserts all over the world. It is a non-profit organisation based in Hamburg. The founding members were the German Association of the Club of Rome, members of the TREC network of scientists as well as committed private supporters and long-time promoters of the DESERTEC idea.

The foundation's missions is to accelerate the implementation of the DESERTEC Concept by:

 Supporting knowledge transfer & scientific co-operation
 Fostering exchange & co-operation with the private sector
 Promoting the establishment of the necessary framework conditions:
 Cooperation with JREF in Asia: In March 2012, a year after the nuclear disaster in Fukushima, the DESERTEC Foundation and the Japan Renewable Energy Foundation (JREF) have signed a MoU. The aim is to accelerate the deployment of renewable energy in Asia to provide secure and sustainable alternatives to fossil and nuclear power by implementing the DESERTEC Concept in Greater East Asia (Asia Super Grid Initiative).
 Evaluating and initiating projects that could serve as models
 Informing about DESERTEC

Dii GmbH
To help accelerate the implementation of the DESERTEC idea in EU-MENA, the non-profit DESERTEC Foundation and a group of 12 European companies led by Munich Re founded an industrial initiative called Dii GmbH in Munich on 30 October 2009. The other companies included Deutsche Bank, E.ON, RWE, Abengoa. 
Like the DESERTEC Foundation, Dii GmbH did not intend to build power plants itself. Instead it focused on four core objectives in EU-MENA:
 Development of long term perspectives for the period up to 2050 providing investment and financing guidance
 Carrying out specific in-depth studies
 Development of a framework for feasible investments into renewable energy and interconnected grids in EU-MENA
 Origination of reference projects to prove feasibility

Dii GmbH aimed to create a positive investment climate for renewable energies and interconnected power grid in North Africa and the Middle East by encouraging the necessary technological, economic, political and market frameworks. This included the development of a long-term implementation perspective called Desert Power 2050 with guidance on investment and funding. Dii GmbH has initiated selected reference projects to demonstrate overall feasibility and reduce system overall costs.

On 24 November 2011, a memorandum of understanding (MoU) was signed between the Medgrid consortium and Dii to study, design and promote an interconnected electrical grid linking DESERTEC and the Medgrid projects. The Medgrid together with DESERTEC would serve as the backbone of the European super grid and the benefits of investing in HVDC technology are being assessed to reach the final goal – the supersmart grid. The activities of Dii and Medgrid were covered by the Mediterranean Solar Plan (MSP), a political initiative within the framework of the Union for the Mediterranean (UfM).

Consortium
The company was formed by the DESERTEC foundation and a consortium of worldwide companies.

As of March 2014, Dii consisted of 20 shareholders (listed below) and 17 associate partners.

  ABB
  Abengoa Solar
  ACWA Power
  Cevital
  Deutsche Bank
  Enel Green Power
  E.ON
  First Solar
  Flagsol
  HSH Nordbank
  Munich Re
  Nareva
  Red Eléctrica de España
  RWE
  Avancis
  Schott Solar
  Terna
  Terna Energy SA
  UniCredit
  State Grid Corporation of China

Managing Director of Dii GmbH has been Paul van Son, a senior international energy manager.

At the end of 2014, most shareholders left Dii which has been described both as a "failure" and as a reorientation in project objectives.

 RWE,  State Grid Corporation of China,  ACWA Power and a number of partner companies stayed on board to drive the new mission of Dii: "To facilitate the rapid deployment of utility-scale renewable energy projects in desert areas, and to integrate them in the interconnected power systems"

Concept details

Description
DESERTEC is a global renewable energy solution based on harnessing sustainable power from the sites where renewable sources of energy are at their most abundant. These sites can be used thanks to low-loss High-Voltage Direct Current transmission. All kinds of renewables will be used in the DESERTEC Concept, but the sun-rich deserts of the world play a special role.

The original and first region for the assessment and application of this concept is the EU-MENA region (European Union, Middle East and Northern Africa). The DESERTEC organisations promote the generation of electricity in North Africa, the Middle East and Europe using renewable sources, such as solar power plants, wind parks, and develop a Euro-Mediterranean electricity network, primarily made up of high voltage direct current (HVDC) transmission cables. Despite its name, DESERTEC's proposal would see most of the power plants located outside of the Sahara Desert itself but rather in the surrounding areas, in the more accessible North and South steppes and woodlands, as well as the relatively moist Atlantic Coastal Desert. Under the DESERTEC proposal, concentrating solar power systems, photovoltaic systems and wind parks would be spread over the wide desert regions in North Africa like the Sahara Desert and all its subdivisions. The generated electricity would be transmitted to European and African countries by a super grid of high-voltage direct current cables. It would provide a considerable part of the electricity demand of the MENA countries and furthermore provide continental Europe with 15% of its electricity needs. Exported desert power would complement Europe's transition to renewables which would be based primarily on harnessing domestic sources of energy that would increase its energy independence. According to a scenario by the German Aerospace Center (DLR), by 2050, investments into solar plants and transmission lines would be total €400 billion. An exact proposal how to realise this scenario, including technical and financial requirements, will be designed by 2012/2013 (see Desert Power 2050).

In March 2012, the DESERTEC Foundation started working in a further focus region. A year after the nuclear disaster in Fukushima, the DESERTEC Foundation and the Japan Renewable Energy Foundation (JREF) have signed a MoU. They will exchange knowledge and know-how, and coordinate their work together to develop suitable framework conditions for the deployment of renewables and to establish transnational cooperation in Greater East Asia. The aim is to accelerate the deployment of renewable energy in Asia to provide secure and sustainable alternatives to fossil and nuclear power. As a part of its mission, JREF promotes the Asia Super Grid Initiative to facilitate an electricity system based fully on renewable energy. The DESERTEC Foundation sees such a grid as an important step towards the implementation of DESERTEC in Greater East Asia and has already conducted a feasibility study on potential grid corridors to make best use of the region's desert sun.

Studies about DESERTEC

DLR studies
The DESERTEC Concept was developed by an international network of politicians, academics and economists, called TREC. The research institutes for renewable sources of the governments of Morocco (CDER), Algeria (NEAL), Libya (CSES), Egypt (NREA), Jordan (NERC) and Yemen (Universities of Sana'a and Aden) as well as the German Aerospace Center (DLR) made significant contributions towards the development of the DESERTEC Concept. The basic studies relating to DESERTEC were led by DLR scientist Dr. Franz Trieb working for the Institute for Technical Thermodynamics at the DLR. The three studies were funded by the German Federal Ministry for the Environment, Nature Conservation, and Nuclear Safety (BMU). The studies, conducted between 2004 and 2007, evaluated the following as shown in the table below;

The studies concluded that the extremely high solar radiation in the deserts of North Africa and the Middle East outweighs the 10–15% transmission losses between the desert regions and Europe. This means that solar thermal power plants in the desert regions are more economical than the same kinds of plants in southern Europe. The German Aerospace Center has calculated that if solar thermal power plants were to be constructed in large numbers in the coming years, the estimated cost of electricity would come down from 0.09 to 0.22 euro/kWh to about 0.04–0.05 euro/kWh.

The Sahara Desert was chosen as an ideal location for solar farms as it is exposed to bright sunshine nearly all the time, roughly between 80% and 97% of the daylight hours in the best cases. This is the sunniest year-round area on the planet. In the world's largest hot desert, there is an extremely vast area, covering almost the whole desert, that receives more than 3,600 h of yearly sunshine. There is also a very large area in excess of 4,000 h of sunshine annually. The highest solar radiation received on the planet is in the Sahara Desert, under the Tropic of Cancer. This results from a general, strong lack of cloud cover year-round and a geographical position under the tropics.

The annual average insolation, which represents the total amount of solar radiation energy received on a given area and on a giver period, is about 2,500 kWh/(m2 year) over the region and this number can soar up to almost 3,000 kWh/(m2 year) in the best cases. The weather features of the Sahara Desert, especially the insolation, have a pronounced nature. The annual electricity production reaches 1,300,000 TWh at maximum in this sun-drenched area if the whole desert is covered in solar panels.
The desert is also extremely vast covering about some 9,000,000 km2 (3,474,920 sq mi), being almost as large as China or the United States and is sparsely populated, making it possible to set up large solar farms without a negative impact on inhabitants of the region, too. Lastly, sand deserts can provide silicon, a raw material that is essential in the production of solar panels.

The great African desert is relatively cloud-free all year long but it's important to note the harsh, desert climate also has some negative features such as extreme heat and sometimes dust or sand-laden winds which frequently blow over the desert and can even result in severe duststorms or sandstorms. Both phenomenons reduce the solar electricity productivity and the efficiency of the solar panels.

Desert Power 2050
Dii announced it would introduce a roll-out-plan in late 2012 which included concrete recommendations on how to enable investments in renewable energy and interconnected power grids. Dii claims to work with all key stakeholders from the international scientific and business communities as well as policy-makers and civil society to enable two or three concrete reference projects to demonstrate the feasibility of the long-term vision.
Dii developed a strategic framework for a fully integrated and decarbonized power system based on renewable energies for the entire North Africa, Middle East, and Europe (EUMENA) region in 2050. Therefore, Dii researched from the viewpoint of technology and geography what is the optimal mix of renewable energies to provide the EUMENA region with sustainable energy. In July 2012 Dii presented the first part of its study "Desert Power 2050 – Perspectives on a Sustainable Power System for EUMENA.

Key Findings

Desert Power 2050 demonstrates that the abundance of sun and wind in the EUMENA region will enable the creation of a joint power network that will entail more than 90 percent renewables. According to the study, such a joint power network involving North Africa, the Middle East, and Europe (EUMENA) offers clear benefits to all involved. The nations of the Middle East and North Africa (MENA) could meet their expanding needs for power with renewable energy, while developing an export industry from their excess power which could reach an annual volume worth more than 60 billion euros, according to the study results. By importing up to 20 percent of its power from the deserts, Europe could save up to 30 euros for each megawatt-hour of desert power.

The north and south would become the powerhouses of this joint network, supported by wind and hydropower in Scandinavia, as well as wind and solar energy in the MENA region. Supply and demand would complement one other – both regionally and seasonally – according to the findings of Desert Power 2050. With its constant supply of wind and solar energy throughout the year, the MENA region can cover Europe's energy needs without the latter having to build costly excess capacities. A further benefit of the power network is the enhanced security of supply to all nations concerned. A renewables-based network would lead to mutual reliance among the countries involved, complemented by inexpensive imports from the south and the north.

Methodology

Desert Power 2050 presents the full perspective of the EUMENA region, which includes, for instance, the growing consumption of power in the MENA states. The power requirements of the MENA states are likely to more than quadruple by 2050, totalling more than 3000 terawatt hours. Unlike in Europe, the population will also grow considerably by the middle of the century, thus heightening the demand for new jobs. 
Analysing the design of a power system built to include more than 90% renewables 40 years into the future is necessarily subject to major uncertainties on a range of assumptions. To address these uncertainties Dii analysed so-called sensitivities, or perspectives, to show how the results react to changed parameters. Dii has analysed a total of 18 perspectives on the EUMENA power supply in 2050. They cover a wide range of major impact factors on the attractiveness of power system integration. The main message of the study: grid integration across the Mediterranean is valuable under all foreseeable circumstances.

Second Phase

Desert energy could be a stimulus for growth and make an important contribution when it comes to coping with the social and economic challenges in North Africa and the Middle East. Dii announced that a second phase of Desert Power 2050, Getting Started, will examine this topic in greater depth in the next few months, with discussions including political, scientific and industrial stakeholders. The objective is to formulate recommendations for the regulatory steps required in the years to come.

Benefits

More energy falls on the world's deserts in six hours than the world consumes in a year, and the Saharan desert is virtually uninhabited and is close to Europe. Supporters say that the project will keep Europe "at the forefront of the fight against climate change and help North African and European economies to grow within greenhouse gas emission limits". DESERTEC officials say the project could one day deliver 15 percent of Europe's electricity and a considerable part of MENA's electricity demand. According to the DESERTEC Foundation, the project has strong job creation potential and could improve the stability in the region. According to the report by Wuppertal Institute for Climate, Environment and Energy and the Club of Rome, the project could create 240,000 German jobs and generate €2 trillion worth of electricity by 2050.

Technology

Concentrated solar power

Concentrated solar power (also called concentrating solar power and CSP) systems use mirrors or lenses to concentrate a large area of sunlight, or solar thermal energy, onto a small area. Electrical power is produced when the concentrated light is converted to heat, which drives a heat engine (usually a steam turbine) connected to an electrical power generator. Molten salt can be employed as a thermal energy storage method to retain thermal energy collected by a solar tower or solar trough so that it can be used to generate electricity in bad weather or at night. Since solar fields feed their heat energy into a conventional generation unit with a steam turbine, they can be combined without any problem with fossil fuel hybrid power plants. This hybridisation secures energy supply also in unfavourable weather and at night without the need of accelerating costly compensatory plants. A technical challenge is the cooling which is necessary for every heating power system. Dii is therefore reliant either on an adequate water supply, coastal facilities or improved cooling technology.

Photovoltaics
Dii also considers photovoltaics (PV) as a technology suitable for desert power plants. Photovoltaics is a method of generating electrical power by converting solar radiation into direct current electricity using semiconductors. Photovoltaic power generation employs solar panels composed of a number of solar cells containing a photovoltaic material. Materials presently used for photovoltaics include monocrystalline silicon, polycrystalline silicon, amorphous silicon, cadmium telluride, and copper indium gallium selenide/sulfide. Driven by advances in technology and increases in manufacturing scale and sophistication, the cost of photovoltaics has declined steadily since the first solar cells were manufactured.

In 2010, First Solar, a producer of thin film solar panels, joined Dii as associated partner. The US based company already has experience with huge PV installations, and has constructed the 550 megawatt Desert Sunlight Solar Farm and Topaz Solar Farm in California, which are the biggest two PV installations of the world.

Wind energy
As also parts of the desert regions in the Middle East and North Africa (MENA) come with high wind potential, Dii is examining in which geographic regions the installation of wind farms is suitable. Wind turbines produce electricity by wind turning the blades, which spin a shaft, which connects to a generator which produces electricity. The Sahara Desert is one of the windiest areas on the planet, especially on the western coast where lies the Atlantic coastal desert along Western Sahara and Mauritania. The annual average wind speed at the ground greatly exceeds 5 m/s in most of the desert, and even approach 8 m/s or 9 m/s along the western ocean coast. It's important to note that wind speed increases with height. The regularity and the constancy of winds in arid regions are major assets for wind energy, too. The winds blow nearly constantly over the desert and there are generally no windless days during throughout the year. Therefore, the desert of North Africa is also an ideal location to install large-scale wind parks and wind turbines with very good productivity.

High-voltage direct current (HVDC)

To export renewable energy produced in the MENA desert region, a high-voltage direct current (HVDC) electric power transmission system is needed. High Voltage DC (HVDC) technology is a proven and economical method of power transmission over very long distances and also a trusted method to connect asynchronous grids or grids of different frequencies. With HVDC energy can also be transported in both directions. For long-distance transmission HVDC suffers lower electrical losses than alternating current (AC) transmission. Because of the higher solar radiation in MENA, the production of energy, even with the included transmissions losses, is still advantageous over the production in South Europe.

Also very long distance projects have already been realised with technological cooperation from ABB and Siemens – both shareholders of Dii; namely the 800 kV HVDC Xiangjiaba-Shanghai transmission system, which was commissioned by State Grid Corporation of China (SGCC) in June 2010. The HVDC link is the most powerful and longest transmission of its kind to be implemented anywhere in the world; and at the time of commissioning, transmitted 6,400 MW of power over a distance of nearly 2,000 kilometres. This is longer than would be needed to link MENA and Europe. Siemens Energy has equipped the sending converter station Fulong for this link with ten DC converter transformers, including five rated at 800 kV.

The second HVDC project which is also for SGCC with cooperation from ABB, is a new HVDC link of 3,000 MW over 920 kilometres from Hulunbeir, in Inner Mongolia, to Shenyang in the province of Liaoning in the North-Eastern part of China in 2010. Another project scheduled for 2014 commissioning – is the construction of an ±800 kV North-East UHVDC link from the North-Eastern and Eastern region of India to the city of Agra across a distance of 1,728 kilometres.

Projects 

The Sahara Desert covers huge parts of Algeria, Chad, Egypt, Libya, Mali, Mauritania, Morocco, Niger, Western Sahara, Sudan and Tunisia. It is one of three distinct physiographic provinces of the African massive physiographic division.

The first solar and wind power projects in North Africa have already begun. Algeria initiated a unique project in 2011 dealing with Hybrid power generation which combines a 25 MW concentrating solar power array in conjunction with a 130 MW combined cycle gas turbine plant Hassi R'Mel integrated solar combined cycle power station.

Other countries like Morocco have set up ambitious plans on the implementation of renewable energy. The Ouarzazate solar power station in Morocco for example, with the capacity of 500 MW, will be one of the largest concentrated solar plants in the world.

In 2011, the DESERTEC Foundation started to evaluate projects that could serve as models for the implementation of DESERTEC according to its sustainability criteria. The first of these is the TuNur solar power plant in Tunisia that is planned to have 2 GW of capacity. Creating up to 20,000 direct and indirect local jobs, its plants include dry-cooling systems that reduce water usage by up to 90%. Construction is planned to begin in 2014, and export power to Italy by 2016. A video on YouTube explains this project.

Talks with the Moroccan government had been successful and the Dii confirmed their first reference project would be in Morocco. As a partner in a beginning partnership between Europe and MENA Morocco is especially well-suited since a grid connection from Morocco via Gibraltar to Spain already exists. Also the Moroccan government enacted a program to support renewable energies. In June 2011, Dii signed a Memorandum of Understanding with the Moroccan Agency for Solar Energy (MASEN). MASEN will act as a project developer and will be responsible for all important project steps in Morocco. Dii will promote the project and its financing in the European Union in Brussels as well as in national governments. This reference project, with a total capacity of 500 MW, will be a combination of concentrated solar power plants (400 MW) and photovoltaics (100 MW). The first available power from the joint Dii/MASEN project could be fed into the Moroccan and Spanish grids between 2014 and 2016, depending on the selected technology and market conditions. Based on the current estimate the total costs are €2 billion.

In April 2010, Dii emphasised that the power plant won't be installed in the region of Western Sahara which is administered by Morocco. An official spokesperson of Dii made the following confirmation: "Our reference projects will not be located in the region. When looking for project sites, the DII will also take political, ecological or cultural issues into consideration. This procedure is in line with the funding policies of international development banks."

In Tunisia, STEG Énergies Renouvelables, a subsidiary of the Tunisian state utility company STEG, and Dii are currently working on a pre-feasibility study. The study focuses on substantial solar and wind energy projects in Tunisia. Research will address the technical and regulatory conditions for the supply of energy in local networks for the export of power to neighbouring countries as well as Europe. Besides financing of the project will be analysed.

Algeria, which offers excellent conditions for renewable energy, is considered as a potential location for a further reference project. In December 2011, the Algerian energy supplier Sonelgaz and Dii signed a Memorandum of Understanding on their future collaboration in the presence of EU Energy Commissioner Günther Oettinger and the Algerian Minister for Energy and Mining Youcef Yousfi. The focus of this cooperation will be the strengthening and the exchange of technical expertise, joint efforts in market development and the progress of renewable energy in Algeria as well as in foreign countries.

Since the Euro-Mediterranean projects, Medgrid and DESERTEC are both attempting to generate solar energy from deserts and complement each other, a MoU was signed on 24 November 2011 between Medgrid and Dii to study, design and promote an interconnected electrical grid linking both projects. The plan is to build five interconnections at a cost of around 5 billion euros ($6.7 billion), including between Tunisia and Italy. The activities of Dii and Medgrid are covered by the Mediterranean Solar Plan (MSP), a political initiative within the framework of the Union for the Mediterranean (UfM).

In March 2012 Dii, Medgrid, Friends of the supergrid and Renewables Grid Initiative signed a joint declaration to support the effective and complete integration, in a single electricity market, of renewable energy from both large-scale and decentralised sources, which shall not be played out against each other in Europe and in its neighbouring regions.

Obstacles
Some experts – such as Professor Tony Day, director of the Centre for Efficient and Renewable Energy in Building at London South Bank University, Henry Wilkinson of Janusian Security Risk Management, and Wolfram Lacher of Control Risks consultancy  – are concerned about political obstacles to the project. Generating so much of the electricity consumed in Europe and in Africa would create a political dependency on North African countries which had corruption before Arab Spring and a lack of cross-border coordination. Moreover, DESERTEC would require extensive economic and political cooperation between Algeria and Morocco, which is at risk as the border between the two countries is closed due to a disagreement over the Western Sahara, Inram Kada by EUMENA, is responsible for expediting the project. Cooperation between the states of Europe and the states of the Middle East and North Africa is also certain to be challenging. Large scale cooperation necessary between the EU and the North African nations the project may be delayed due to bureaucratic red tape and other factors such as expropriation of assets.

There are also concerns that the water requirement for the solar plant to clean dust off panels and for turbine coolant may be detrimental to local populations in terms of the demand it will place on the local water supply. An EU innovation supported project however resulted in the development of a silicone based film with a nano-dentrite structure on it.  The film is fused on top of the solar panels and the nano-dentrite structure makes that sand, water, salt, bacteria, molds, etc. can't attach to the photovoltaic panels.
Opposed to this, studies point out the generation of fresh water by the solar thermal plants. Furthermore, no significant amount of water is needed for cleaning and cooling, since alternative technologies can be used (dry cleaning, dry cooling). However, dry cooling is more expensive, technologically challenging and less efficient than the water cooling currently planned. Plans for water desalination for cooling purposes are not part of the DESERTEC business plan or cost estimates as proposed.

The late Hermann Scheer (Eurosolar) pointed out that the doubled solar radiation in the Sahara can not be the only criterion especially with its continuous trade winds there .

Transmitting energy over long distances has been criticized, with questions raised over the cost of cabling compared to energy generation, and over electricity losses. However, the study and current operating technology show that electricity losses using high-voltage direct current transmission amount to only 3% per 1,000 km (10% per 3,000 km).

Investment may be required within Europe in a "supergrid". In response, one proposal is to cascade power between neighbouring states so that states draw on the power generation of neighbouring states rather than from distant desert sites.

One key question will be the cultural aspect, as Middle Eastern and African nations may need assurance that they will own the project rather than it being imposed from Europe.

See also

 Medgrid
 European super grid
 Intermittent energy source
 List of HVDC projects
 North Sea Offshore Grid
 Renewable energy in Morocco
 Relative cost of electricity generated by different sources
 Solar energy in Israel
 Solel
 SuperSmart Grid
 Wind power in Morocco
 SunCable Australia - Singapore

References

External links

 DESERTEC Foundation
 Dii GmbH

Proposed electric power transmission systems
Renewable energy in the European Union
Energy in Africa
2009 establishments in Germany
Energy companies of Germany
Macro-engineering
Foundations based in Germany